Ignatzschineria indica is a Gram-negative, aerobic, non-spore-forming and non-motile bacterium from the genus of Ignatzschineria which has been isolated from the gut content of flesh flies from Pune in India.

References

Alteromonadales
Bacteria described in 2011